Reevesville is a town in Dorchester County, South Carolina, United States. The population was 196 at the 2010 census. As defined by the U.S. Office of Management and Budget, and used by the U.S. Census Bureau for statistical purposes only, Reevesville is included within the  Charleston-North Charleston-Summerville metropolitan area.

Geography
Reevesville is located at  (33.204144, -80.647228).

According to the United States Census Bureau, the town has a total area of 1.6 square miles (4.2 km2), of which, 1.6 square miles (4.1 km2) of it is land and 0.04 square miles (0.1 km2) of it (1.23%) is water.

History

Reevesville was most likely named after the family of L. Pressley Reeves, South Carolina's first game warden.

In 1904, an African-American man called General Lee was lynched by a mob after he knocked on a white woman's door.

Demographics

As of the census of 2000, there were 207 people, 90 households, and 62 families residing in the town. The population density was 129.0 people per square mile (50.0/km2). There were 114 housing units at an average density of 71.1 per square mile (27.5/km2). The racial makeup of the town was 77.78% White, 21.74% African American, and 0.48% from two or more races.

There were 90 households, out of which 24.4% had children under the age of 18 living with them, 52.2% were married couples living together, 14.4% had a female householder with no husband present, and 31.1% were non-families. 28.9% of all households were made up of individuals, and 17.8% had someone living alone who was 65 years of age or older. The average household size was 2.30 and the average family size was 2.82.

In the town, the population was spread out, with 19.3% under the age of 18, 5.8% from 18 to 24, 24.2% from 25 to 44, 31.4% from 45 to 64, and 19.3% who were 65 years of age or older. The median age was 46 years. For every 100 females, there were 86.5 males. For every 100 females age 18 and over, there were 74.0 males.

The median income for a household in the town was $26,667, and the median income for a family was $38,750. Males had a median income of $31,875 versus $30,357 for females. The per capita income for the town was $17,555. About 8.8% of families and 14.0% of the population were below the poverty line, including 29.4% of those under the age of eighteen and 14.5% of those 65 or over.

References

Towns in Dorchester County, South Carolina
Towns in South Carolina
Charleston–North Charleston–Summerville metropolitan area